Viridis  may refer to:
 8774 Viridis, a Main Belt asteroid
 Viridis Visconti (1352–1414), an Italian noblewoman, a daughter of Bernabò Visconti and his wife Beatrice Regina della Scala

See also